Daimler Truck North America LLC (formerly Freightliner Corporation) is an automotive industry manufacturer of commercial vehicles headquartered in Portland, Oregon, and LLC of the German multinational Daimler Truck AG.

On October 1, 2021, Daimler AG stockholders approved a spinoff of the truck division.

Brands
Alliance Parts
Detroit Diesel
Freightliner Trucks
Freightliner Custom Chassis Corporation
Freightliner SelecTrucks
Thomas Built Buses
Western Star Trucks
Demand Detroit
Sterling Trucks

Fuso Trucks America, while mostly owned by Daimler Truck, currently operates separately from Daimler Trucks North America.

History

Early years
1896- Gottlieb Daimler creates the first truck. 
1923- First diesel truck: Benz
1926- Daimler and Benz merge.
1942- Leland James founds the Freightliner Corporation. 
1947- Freightliner opens its first truck plant in Portland, Oregon.
1950- Hyster Company is the first private carrier to order a Freightliner truck.
1951- Freightliner signs agreement to retail trucks through White Motor Corporation dealerships.

1960s and 1970s
1967- Western Star founded by White Motor Corporation.
1976- Freightliner opens new corporate headquarters in Portland, Oregon and sets up regional sales offices.
1977- Freightliner launches an independent network of dealerships and ends its agreement with White Motor Corporation.

1980s and 1990s
1981- Daimler-Benz AG purchases Freightliner Corporation from Consolidated Freightways.
1992- Production starts at Freightliner's new truck plant in St. Thomas, Ontario Canada
1995- Freightliner launches Freightliner Custom Chassis Corporation and acquires American LaFrance.
1997- Freightliner acquires Ford Motor Company's heavy-truck business and names it "Sterling." Freightliner launches SelecTrucks.
1998- Freightliner acquires Thomas Built Buses.  Daimler-Benz and Chrysler merge.
1999- The one-millionth Freightliner truck is built.

2000s
2000- Freightliner acquires Western Star Trucks. DaimlerChrysler buys Detroit Diesel Corporation.
2002- Western Star production moves to Portland.
2003- Thomas Built Buses debuts the Saf-T-Liner C2, a revolutionary school bus design. 
2004- Freightliner opens its high-tech wind tunnel center in Portland, Oregon. FCCC introduces the hybrid electric walk-in van chassis.
2005- Opening of a high-tech cold chamber in Portland, Oregon.
2007- Daimler and Chrysler split.  The new Daimler AG is founded.  Freightliner LLC is renamed Daimler Trucks North America.  in 2007. Detroit Diesel starts production of the new heavy-duty engine – the DD15.  Saltillo, Mexico plant opens.  
2008- Parts of the company's operations are moved to Fort Mill, SC.  Freightliner LLC becomes Daimler Trucks North America, LLC.

2010s
2014- Western Star introduces "The 5700" on-highway tractor with product placement in the latest Transformers movie "Age of Extinction" as the heroic lead character, Optimus Prime. Freightliner Custom Chassis Corporation launches UltraSteer passive rear steer axles for recreational vehicles to improve maneuverability and extend tire life.
2015- DTNA completes its SuperTruck program after achieving 115% freight efficiency improvement and 12.2 MPG during final testing as part of a U.S. Dept. of Energy research program. Detroit Assurance is introduced in Freightliner Cascadia. Daimler Trucks North America introduces the world's first autonomous commercial vehicle licensed for use on U.S. public roads. The Freightliner Inspiration Truck was unveiled before a global audience at Nevada's Hoover Dam.
2016- Daimler Trucks North America opens its new LEED Platinum headquarters on its campus in Portland, Oregon. Thomas Built Buses celebrates its 100th anniversary. . Thomas Built Buses launches the industry's first compressed natural gas Type C school bus. Detroit launches the DD5™ medium-duty engine.
2017- Western Star celebrates its 50th anniversary. Freightliner celebrates its 75th anniversary. Freightliner Trucks introduces the new Cascadia with Detroit IDP (integrated powertrain management), which helps achieve up to an 8% fuel efficiency improvement over the Cascadia® Evolution.
2018- Thomas Built Buses launches the all-electric "Jouley" Saf-T-Liner C2. Detroit launches the DD8™ medium-duty engine.

2020s
2020- Starting in January, Daimler Trucks North America took over official support of Setra coaches in North America, along with distribution being taken over by Daimler's new subsidiary, Daimler Coaches North America.
2021- Daimler AG Stockholders approve spinoff of truck division.

DTNA Assembly Plants
 Cleveland, North Carolina (Freightliner) 
 Mount Holly, North Carolina (Freightliner)
 Gaffney, South Carolina (Freightliner Custom Chassis Corporation)
 Gastonia, North Carolina (Alliance Truck Parts)
 High Point, North Carolina (Thomas Built Buses)
 Portland, Oregon (Western Star) 
 Redford, Michigan (Detroit) 
 Santiago Tianguistenco, Estado de Mexico, Mexico (Freightliner) 
 Saltillo, Coahuila, Mexico (Freightliner)

References

External links
 Daimler Truck North America official website

Daimler Truck
Companies based in Portland, Oregon
Truck manufacturers of the United States
Bus manufacturers of the United States
American companies established in 2008
Vehicle manufacturing companies established in 2008
American subsidiaries of foreign companies